David Johnson (October 20, 1809 – April 28, 1886) was an American jurist, legislator, and lawyer.

Born in Sangerfield, New York, Johnson studied law in New York and was admitted to the New York bar. In 1838, Johnson settled in Jackson, Michigan and continued to practice law. He served as school inspector and district attorney. From 1846 to 1850, Johnson served as Jackson County, Michigan circuit court judge and was a Democrat. In 1845 and 1847, Johnson served in the Michigan House of Representatives. From 1852 to 1857, Johnson served on the Michigan Supreme Court. In 1864, Johnson was defeated in a Congressional election race. Johnson continued to practice law. Johnson died at his house in Jackson, Michigan.

Notes

1809 births
1886 deaths
Politicians from Jackson, Michigan
People from Oneida County, New York
Michigan lawyers
New York (state) lawyers
Michigan state court judges
Justices of the Michigan Supreme Court
Democratic Party members of the Michigan House of Representatives
19th-century American politicians
19th-century American judges
19th-century American lawyers